Phytoecia centaureae is a species of beetle in the family Cerambycidae. It was described by Sama, Rapuzzi and Rejzek in 2007.

References

Phytoecia
Beetles described in 2007